Nealy Ridge is an unincorporated community in Dickenson County, Virginia, in the United States.

History
A post office was established at Nealy Ridge in 1909, and remained in operation until it was discontinued in 1961. The community was probably named for Cornealius "Nealy" Vanover, an early settler.

References

Unincorporated communities in Dickenson County, Virginia
Unincorporated communities in Virginia